Établissement scolaire français Blaise-Pascal (ESFBP) is a French international school in Lubumbashi, Democratic Republic of the Congo. It is named after Blaise Pascal.

Established in 2009, it first opened in September of that year. It is a part of the Mission laïque française (MLF), and it operates classes for toute petite until seconde (first year of lycée - equivalent to sixth form college/high school) directory, then première and terminale (final two years of lycée) with the distance education programme from the National Centre for Distance Education (CNED).  it has about 340 students.

References

French international schools in Africa
Buildings and structures in Lubumbashi
International schools in the Democratic Republic of the Congo
Educational institutions established in 2009
2009 establishments in the Democratic Republic of the Congo
Elementary and primary schools in the Democratic Republic of the Congo
High schools and secondary schools in the Democratic Republic of the Congo
International high schools